Carmencita Abad, known as Carmencita Decano Abad in real life, (born 1933) is a Filipina actress. She made her film debut with Tres Muskiteros (a.k.a. 3 Muskiteers) was a younger sister of another PreWar actress Corazon Noble.

Inspired of Alexander Dumas's The Three Muskiteers a Filipino version made by Sampaguita Pictures in 1951 was Abad's first major role. The only movie under Sampaguita Pictures that was released in 1951 before she moved to the rival company, Lvn Pictures,  in the early 1950s.

Abad's first movie in Lvn Pictures was in cameo roles with Evelyn Villar teamed up with a handsome lead actor of the company Armando Goyena as a Filipino Super Hero as Kapitan Kidlat from the movie Kidlat, Ngayon.

Early life

Filmography
 1951 – Tres Muskiteros  a.k.a. Three Muskiteers
 1953 – Kidlat, Ngayon – Lvn Pictures, a.k.a. Lightning, Today
 1954 – Damong Ligaw  – Lvn Pictures
 1954 – Ikaw ang Dahilan  – Lvn, a.k.a. You are the Reason
 1954 – Singsing na Tanso – Lvn Pictures, a.k.a. Silver Ring
 1955 – Tagapagmana  – Lvn, a.k.a. Inheritance
 1955 – Hagad  – Lvn Pictures, a.k.a. Police
 1955 – 1 2 3 – Lvn Pictures
 1955 – Panyolitong Bughaw  – Lvn Pictures, a.k.a. Blue Handkerchief
 1955 – Karnabal  – Lvn Pictures, a.k.a. Carnival
 1956 – No Money, No Honey – Lvn Pictures
 1956 – Everlasting – Lvn
 1956 – Medalyong Perlas – Lvn, a.k.a. Pearl Necklace
 1956 – Kumander 13 –  Lvn, Commander 13
 1957 – Dalawang Ina –  Lvn, a.k.a. Two Mothers
 1957 – Rosalina  – Lvn
 1958 – Zarex – Lvn
 1959 – Bayanihan – Lvn
 1959 – Biyaya ng Lupa – Lvn

External links
 

1933 births
Living people
20th-century Filipino actresses